Miroslav Šatan (born 22 October 1974) is a Slovak former professional ice hockey right winger, who played 15 seasons in the National Hockey League (NHL), five in the Tipos Extraliga, and three in the Kontinental Hockey League (KHL).

Playing career

Pre-NHL
In 1991–92, Šatan played for the local HC Topoľčany and did remarkably well, as he scored 30 goals and had 22 assists in just 31 games. He then graduated to the senior division within the same year. When he became 18, he joined Dukla Trenčín rather than enter compulsory army service for Slovakia (which stopped in 2006). He played there for the 1992–93 and 1993–94 seasons.

Edmonton Oilers
Šatan was drafted 111th overall in the 1993 NHL Entry Draft by the Edmonton Oilers. Prior to his entry into the NHL, he played in the Czechoslovak and Slovak leagues and he had scored nine goals in eight games representing Slovakia at the 1994 Winter Olympic Games.

In 1994–95, Šatan played a season in the minor leagues, split between four teams including the Oilers' minor league affiliate, the Cape Breton Oilers, and the International Hockey League's Detroit Vipers. While with the Vipers, he scored the winning goal in an exhibition game against Wayne Gretzky's Ninety-Niners, an all-star team put together by Gretzky during the 1994–95 NHL lockout.

Buffalo Sabres
After two seasons with the Oilers, Šatan was traded to the Buffalo Sabres in exchange for Craig Millar and Barrie Moore. He would lead the Sabres in scoring on six occasions. During the 2004–05 NHL Lockout, Šatan played for Slovan Bratislava in the Slovak Extraliga. After the lockout, Šatan was not offered a contract by the Sabres.

New York Islanders
Šatan signed as a free agent with the New York Islanders on August 3, 2005.  He led the Islanders in goals in the 2005–06 season. His 35 goals during the season were his highest goal-output since the 2001–02 season with the Sabres. Almost half his 35 goals came on the power play (17), also a career personal best. Šatan tied for the team lead in points with 66, shared with captain Alexei Yashin. Also in 2005–06, Šatan went seven for ten (70%) and was third in the NHL in shooting percentage in the shootout.

On December 2, 2006, he scored his 300th career goal, against the Pittsburgh Penguins. Earlier in the season, he had recorded his 300th career assist and his 600th career point.

On March 24, 2007, Šatan missed the Islanders' game in Philadelphia for personal reasons, ending a streak of having played in 305 consecutive games. It was the fourth longest active streak at the time, and marked the second time in his career that he had played over 250 consecutive games. He had a 256-game streak as a member of the Sabres that ended in November 2002.

Pittsburgh Penguins

On July 3, 2008, Šatan signed a one-year contract with the Pittsburgh Penguins. During the 2008–09 season, Šatan was placed on waivers by Pittsburgh on March 4, 2009, the same day as the NHL trade deadline, not long after playing in his 1,000th NHL game. Having not been claimed by another team, Šatan was assigned to the Penguins' American Hockey League (AHL) affiliate, the Wilkes-Barre/Scranton Penguins. In Wilkes-Barre, Šatan had three goals and nine points in ten games. Various reports credited him with being upbeat and a good influence, especially with the younger players.

On April 10, 2009, Šatan was recalled by Pittsburgh and cleared re-entry waivers. He re-established himself with the Penguins in the 2009 Stanley Cup playoffs when he played against the Washington Capitals in Game 5 of the Eastern Conference Semifinals on April 23. He then played in nine games and won his first ever Stanley Cup as a member of the Penguins.

The Penguins did not re-sign Šatan when his contract expired at the end of the season, and he was not signed during the free agency period.

Boston Bruins
On January 2, 2010, Šatan signed a US$700,000 contract with the Boston Bruins for the remainder of the 2009–10 season. The contract included a no movement clause. He made his Bruins debut against the Ottawa Senators on January 5, finishing with a +2 plus-minus. He scored his first a goal as a Bruin on January 7 against Chicago Blackhawks goaltender Antti Niemi. On April 21, he scored the game-winning goal in double overtime to defeat the Buffalo Sabres and take a 3–1 lead in the Eastern Conference Quarterfinals. On April 26, Šatan then scored the series-winning goal over the Sabres with 5:11 remaining in the game.

Dynamo Moscow
At the beginning of 2011, Šatan signed with Dynamo Moscow of the Kontinental Hockey League (KHL) until the end of 2010–11 season. The club opted not to renew his contract upon its expiry.

Return to Slovan Bratislava and retirement
On September 8, 2011, Šatan moved to the Slovak Extraliga to rejoin former club Slovan Bratislava. In 2012–13, Slovan moved from the Slovak Extraliga to the KHL and named Šatan team captain. He was badly injured by his former Boston Bruins teammate Zdeno Chára in a match against Lev Praha on 3 November 2012. Subsequently, Šatan said he did not know if he would play another hockey match in his life. Šatan would return to play in the 2013 IIHF World Championship.

Šatan announced his retirement from professional ice hockey on May 20, 2014, at age 39.

Post-hockey career
In September 2015, Šatan was appointed general manager for Team Europe to compete in the 2016 World Cup. Team Europe finished second in the tournament after losing the final series to Canada.

In June 2019, he was elected President of the Slovak Ice Hockey Federation.

International play

 

Šatan captained the Slovak national team to gold, silver, and bronze in multiple world championships:
Winter Olympic Games – 1994, 2002, 2006, 2010
World Championships –  1994 (Pool C – gold medal), 1995 (Pool B – gold medal), 1996, 2000 (as a captain won silver medal), 2002 (as a captain won gold medal), 2003 (as a captain won bronze medal), 2004, 2005, 2007, 2010, 2011, 2012 (silver medal), 2013, 2014
World Cup of Hockey – 1996, 2004
Team Slovakia – 180 caps / 86 goals

Personal life
Šatan grew up in Topoľčany, Slovakia. He married his long-time girlfriend Ingrid in 2004. They have a son, Miroslav Jr., born in March 2006 and a daughter, Viktoria, born in July 2009. He lives in Jericho, New York.

Because Šatan's name is a heteronym of Satan, many devil-related jokes have been made at his expense. During his career, many sports-data sites (including Fox Sports, Sports Illustrated, ESPN and Yahoo) used the number 666 in the URL of Šatan's page. A popular April Fool's joke had Šatan traded to the New Jersey Devils and been made captain of his new team, making Šatan the "leader" of the Devils. After Šatan announced his retirement in 2014, the Yahoo headline read: "Satan be gone!"

Awards and honors
Champion of Slovak Extraliga in 1994 and 2012.
Played in NHL All-Star Game – 2000, 2003
Stanley Cup champion – Pittsburgh Penguins in 2009.
Played in KHL All-Star Game – 2014
Introduced into the IIHF All-Time Slovakia Team - 2020
Captain of the Winning Team (Slovakia) - IIHF World Championship 2002

Records
Led Buffalo Sabres in points six times;
Tenth place on Buffalo Sabres all-time scoring list with 224 goals and 232 assists (seventh in goals scored).

Career statistics

Regular season and playoffs

International

See also
List of NHL players with 1000 games played

References

External links
 
 Sports Illustrated Player profile
 Miroslav Šatan´s hockey cards gallery
 
 
 

1974 births
Living people
Sportspeople from Topoľčany
Boston Bruins players
Buffalo Sabres captains
Buffalo Sabres players
Cape Breton Oilers players
Czechoslovak ice hockey right wingers
Slovak ice hockey right wingers
Detroit Falcons (CoHL) players
Detroit Vipers players
Edmonton Oilers draft picks
Edmonton Oilers players
HK Dukla Trenčín players
HC Slovan Bratislava players
Ice hockey players at the 1994 Winter Olympics
Ice hockey players at the 2002 Winter Olympics
Ice hockey players at the 2006 Winter Olympics
Ice hockey players at the 2010 Winter Olympics
IIHF Hall of Fame inductees
National Hockey League All-Stars
New York Islanders players
Olympic ice hockey players of Slovakia
Pittsburgh Penguins players
San Diego Gulls (IHL) players
Slovak expatriate ice hockey players in Russia
Slovak expatriate ice hockey players in the United States
Slovak expatriate ice hockey players in Canada
Stanley Cup champions
Wilkes-Barre/Scranton Penguins players
Slovak ice hockey coaches